Vera may refer to:

Names
Vera (surname), a surname (including a list of people with the name)
Vera (given name), a given name (including a list of people and fictional characters with the name)
Vera, archbishop of the archdiocese of Tarragona

Places

Spain
Vera, Almería, a municipality in the province of Almería, Andalusia
Vera de Bidasoa, a municipality in the autonomous community of Navarra
La Vera, a comarca in the province of Cáceres, Extremadura

United States
Vera, Illinois, an unincorporated community
Vera, Kansas, a ghost town
Vera, Missouri, an unincorporated community
Vera, Oklahoma, a town
Vera, Texas, an unincorporated community
Vera, Virginia, an unincorporated community
Veradale, Washington, originally known as Vera, CDP

Elsewhere
Vera, Santa Fe, a city in the province of Santa Fe, Argentina
Vera Department, an administrative subdivision (departamento) of the province of Santa Fe
Vera, Mato Grosso, Brazil, a municipality
Cape Vera, Nunavut, Canada, an uninhabited headland on Devon Island
Vera, Croatia, a village

Vera, Italy, a frazione in Cortina d'Ampezzo, Veneto
Vera, Norway, a village in the municipality of Verdal in Trøndelag county, Norway

Entertainment
Vera; or, The Nihilists, an 1882 play by Oscar Wilde
 Vera (album), by Crooked Colours, 2017
"Vera" (song), a 1979 song by Pink Floyd from The Wall
Vera (novel), a 1921 novel by Elizabeth von Arnim
Vera (film), a 1987 film about Sandra Mara Herzer
Véra (Mrs. Vladimir Nabokov), Pulitzer-Prize winning biography on Véra Nabokova 
Vera (TV series), a British detective television series

Other uses 
Vision Electronic Recording Apparatus, an early videotape recording system
VERA passive sensor, a Czech passive sensor system
245 Vera, an asteroid
Bitstream Vera, a family of typefaces
Typhoon Vera, a 1959 tropical  cyclone
The Vera Project, a music-based, non-profit organization in Seattle, Washington
Vera Institute of Justice, a non-profit organization advocating for criminal justice reform
Vienna Environmental Research Accelerator, a particle accelerator
Vera or Verawood, the wood of Bulnesia trees
Vera (horse), winner of the 1883 Kentucky Oaks
Vera (Groningen), a pop center in the city of Groningen, see music venues in the Netherlands
The VERA Project (VLBI Exploration of Radio Astronomy), of the National Astronomical Observatory of Japan
"Veras" or "Vera Lynns", cockney rhyming slang for "skins" (cigarette rolling papers)

See also
 OpenVera, a hardware verification language
 Tropical Storm Vera
 Veras
 Veracruz (disambiguation)
 Vere (disambiguation)
 Ver (disambiguation)
 
 VeraCrypt, a free and open source encryption software forked from TrueCrypt.